is a type of Japanese pottery that is a form of Kyō ware from Kyoto.

It is related to other Kyō wares such as Awata ware and Kiyomizu ware, but denotes the kiln it originates from.

References

External links 
 http://www.metmuseum.org/art/collection/search/667256 
 http://www.metmuseum.org/art/collection/search/44927
 http://www.jan-fineart-london.com/collection?id=426

Culture in Kyoto Prefecture
Japanese pottery